Sohbet, meaning "conversation", "discussion", "chat" in Turkish, may refer to:

 Traditional Sohbet meetings, a cultural tradition in Turkey
 The discussion at the closing of the Jem Alevi ceremony
 An address of a Sufi leader to the community; see

See also
 Söhbətli